Capitalism: A Journal of History and Economics is a biannual peer-reviewed academic journal covering the history of economics and examining the development of capitalism and economic thought. Its focus is on how economic questions relate to environmentalism and power relations such as race, class, and gender.

The journal was established in 2020 and is published by the University of Pennsylvania Press. It is available online through Project MUSE. The editors-in-chief are C. N. Biltoft (Graduate Institute of International and Development Studies), Marc Flandreau (University of Pennsylvania), Francesca Trivellato (Institute for Advanced Study), and Julia Ott (Eugene Lang College of Liberal Arts).

References

External links

Economic history journals
Publications established in 2020
University of Pennsylvania Press academic journals
Biannual journals
English-language journals